Lisandro Monteiro Furt (born 17 July 1999), better known by his stage name Lisandro Cuxi, is a Portuguese-French singer-songwriter and dancer. In 2017, Cuxi won the sixth season of The Voice: la plus belle voix as part of Team M. Pokora. He released his debut album named Ma bonne étoile in September 2017.

Early life
His family was originally from Cape Verde. Cuxi was born on 17 July 1999 in Lisbon, Portugal. At aged nine he moved to Cannes despite not being able to speak French. He then learned both French and English especially with songs.

Career

2015: The Voice Kids
In 2015, he took part in season 2 of the French television series The Voice Kids, broadcast from 25 September to 23 October 2015. In the blind auditions, Cuxi sang "Run to You" by Whitney Houston, all three coaches turning their chairs. Cuxi chose to be part of Team Jenifer. He went on to reach Final and finished in second.

2017: The Voice: la plus belle voix & Ma bonne étoile

In 2017, he took part in season 6 of the French television series The Voice: la plus belle voix, broadcast on TF1 from 18 February to 10 June 2017. In the blind auditions, Cuxi sang "Can't Stop the Feeling" by Justin Timberlake with all four coaches, Florent Pagny, Mika, Zazie and M. Pokora turning their chairs. Cuxi chose to be part of Team Matt. Cuxi went on to win the show.

Performances

After winning The Voice: la plus belle voix on 10 June 2017, he released his debut single "Danser" on 17 June. The song peaked at number 18 on the French Singles Chart. His debut studio album, Ma bonne étoile was released on 15 September 2017 by Mercury Records and includes the single "Danser", co-written by Dany Synthé and Émilie Satt. The album peaked at number 16 on the French Albums Chart.

2018–present: Eurovision Song Contest

On 7 January 2018, he was confirmed as one artists competing in Destination Eurovision the national final organised by France 2 to select France's entry for Eurovision Song Contest 2018. He performed during the first semi-final which was filmed on 8 January 2018 and aired on 13 January 2018. He performed a cover of "Billie Jean" by Michael Jackson and his Eurovision song "Eva". He progressed to the Final by winning the semi-final. Results in the semi-final were determined by a Francophone jury panel and an international jury panel. The final aired live on 27 January 2018.  Despite winning the international jury vote, he placed third in the public vote and finished in second place behind winners Madame Monsieur.

Discography

Albums

Singles

Awards and nominations

References

Living people
People from Torres Vedras
The Voice (franchise) winners
Portuguese emigrants to France
Portuguese people of Cape Verdean descent
French people of Cape Verdean descent
1999 births
21st-century French singers
21st-century French male singers